Malcolm Dalglish (born  August 14, 1952) is an American hammered dulcimer player and builder, composer, and choral director.

A virtuoso performer on the hammer dulcimer, he is a former member of the folk/Celtic trio Metamora and has performed frequently with the percussionist Glen Velez. In addition to the dulcimer, Dalglish also plays the spoons and bones (both traditional American percussion instruments).  Beginning in the mid-1970s he honed his playing at Hap's Irish Pub in Cincinnati in a duo with flutist and concertina player Grey Larsen.  He also composes prolifically for choir, and many of his compositions are for choir with dulcimer accompaniment. He has received more than 50 commissions to compose for choirs around the world. He played the hammered dulcimer in the score for the 1981 film Tuck Everlasting. Several of his songs with the Ooolite choral group come from the poetic work of Wendell Berry.

Dalglish attended Oberlin College and the University of Cincinnati College-Conservatory of Music. He lives in Bloomington, Indiana, where his publishing company, Ooolitic Music, is based.

Discography

As leader
 1977 Banish Misfortune (with Grey Larsen) (June Appal)
 1978 First of Autumn (with Grey Larsen) (June Appal)
 1982 Thunderhead (with Grey Larsen) (Flying Fish)
 1986 Jogging the Memory (Windham Hill)
 1991 Hymnody of Earth (Music Masters)
 1997 Pleasure (Ooolitic)
 2003 Carpe Diem! A Ceremony of Song [live]

With Metamora
 1984 Root Crops and Ground Cover (Tarquel)
 1985 Metamora (Pamlico)
 1987 The Great Road (Pamlico)
 1990 Morning Walk (Windham Hill)

With Ooodoo
 2007 Into the Sky (Ooolitic)

See also 
List of ambient music artists

External links
 The Malcolm Dalglish and Ooolitic Music Website
 Malcolm Dalglish interview by N. Scott Robinson
 [ Allmusic entry for Malcolm Dalglish]

1952 births
20th-century classical composers
21st-century classical composers
American male classical composers
American classical composers
Hammered dulcimer players
Musicians from Bloomington, Indiana
Living people
21st-century American composers
Windham Hill Records artists
University of Cincinnati – College-Conservatory of Music alumni
20th-century American composers
20th-century American male musicians
21st-century American male musicians